South Wedge Historic District is a national historic district and neighborhood located in southeast Rochester, Monroe County, New York. The district encompasses 434 contributing buildings in a predominantly residential section of Rochester.  The district includes a variety of residential buildings built primarily between the 1840s and 1920s, and consists mainly of two-story detached houses built as single-family or two-family residences. The architecture is primarily vernacular with a few examples of high-style Italianate and Queen Anne style residences.  Located in the district are the separately listed Saint Andrew's Episcopal Church and Nazareth House.  Other notable buildings include the St. Boniface Church complex, the former School 13, the former School 28, and former Engine Company No. 8.

It was listed on the National Register of Historic Places in 2013.

References

Historic districts on the National Register of Historic Places in New York (state)
Italianate architecture in New York (state)
Queen Anne architecture in New York (state)
Historic districts in Rochester, New York
National Register of Historic Places in Rochester, New York